Thiruvalla, alternately spelled Tiruvalla, is a town in Kerala and the Headquarters of the Taluk of the same name located in Pathanamthitta district in the State of Kerala, India. It lies on the banks of the Pambas and Manimala rivers, and is a land-locked region surrounded by irrigating streams and rivers.It is the largest town in the district and central Travancore.

Thiruvalla is regarded as the "Land of Non resident Indians". It is the financial,educational,cultural  and commercial capital of central travancore.

Demographics
Males constitute 48% of the population and females 52%. In Thiruvalla, 5% of the population is under 6 years of age.

Etymology 
Tradition tells that the name Thiruvalla comes from the word "Valla Vaay", named after the river Manimala which was known as Vallayār in ancient times. Before roads were developed, Thiruvalla village developed at the mouth of the river Vallayar, connected far and near places through waterways, and hence was known as Valla vāi(vāy in old Malayalam means mouth of river). Later the Thamizh Prefix 'Thiru (means holy /revered) attached to it and became Thiruvalla.

Sree Vallabha is the presiding deity of the Thiruvalla Temple and argues that shreevallabha Puram (Land of Vallabhan) became Thiruvalla. Thiruvalla as per the Sanskrit work "श्रीवल्लभ क्षेत्र माहात्म्यम्" (ശ്രീവല്ലഭ ക്ഷേത്ര മാഹാത്മ്യം) (śrīvallabha kṣētra māhātmyaṁ) is "श्रीवल्लभपुरम्" (ശ്രീവല്ലഭപുരം)(śrīvallabhapuraṁ). The work is said to be of 10th-century CE.

Geography and climate 
Thiruvalla lies at an altitude of 9 meters above sea level on the basin of the Pamba and Manimala rivers. Thiruvalla is dotted with several natural canal streams (called "thodu" in Malayalam) like Chanthathodu, Manippuzha, Mullelithodu, and several others. The city area has riverine alluvial soil, and eastern parts have a laterite loam kind of soil classified under "Southern Midlands" agro-ecological zone, while the western suburbs like Niranam have a more sandy type of soil that resembles beaches. (Kuttanad agro-ecological zone) The reason for this is believed to be the older status of Niranam as a port, before reclamation of Kuttanad from sea occurred. The Upper Kuttanad region in Thiruvalla has the "Karappadam" type of soil, which is clay loam in texture, has high organic matter, and is situated in areas about 1–2 m above sea level.

Thiruvalla has a tropical monsoon climate. There is significant rainfall in most months of the year. The short dry season has little effect on the overall climate. The Köppen-Geiger climate classification is Am. The temperature here averages 27.3 °C. In a year, the average rainfall is 3298 mm.

At an average temperature of 29.0 °C, April is the hottest month of the year. July has the lowest average temperature of the year. It is 26.4 °C. Between the driest and wettest months, the difference in precipitation is 574 mm. Precipitation is the lowest in January, with an average of 22 mm. With an average of 596 mm, the most precipitation falls in June.

Due to its proximity to the equator, Thiruvalla has very little variation in average temperature. During the year, the average temperatures vary by 2.6 °C.

Thiruvalla is known for its pleasant and welcoming weather. South West Monsoon winds bring heavy showers to Thiruvalla in the months of August for a couple of months. The best time to visit this historical town is after the rains as the healthy showers of monsoon leave this place lush green and pristine.

History
This article is primarily about the history of the settlements in areas of the present city around the temple, known historically as Thiruvalla. For the history of the places in Thiruvalla, also refer History of Niranam, History of Koipuram, History of Kumbanad, History of Kavumbhagom.

Ancient period 
There is plenty of evidence to suggest that the area had been inhabited since 500 BCE, although an organized settlement was only founded around 800 CE.  The present-day areas of Niranam, and Kadapra on the western part of Thiruvalla were submerged under the sea before then. It is one of the 64 ancient brahmana graamams.

Stone axes have been reported from Thiruvalla, belonging to Neolithic Age. Thiruvalla has many Neolithic remains and got civilized earlier. The Aryan culture presented Thiruvalla as one of the 64 Brahmin settlements of Kerala, and one of the important too. Ptolemy mentions the Baris river, the present "Pamba" river.

Thiruvalla was also an important commercial centre with the Niranam port in olden days, which is described by Pliny as "Nelcynda". At this light, the "Bacare" could have been modern "Purakkad". The fact that modern western Thiruvalla contains the coastal kind of sand, and several seashells in the soil despite being landlocked proves that prior to the reclamation of Kuttanad from sea, Niranam and the whole western Thiruvalla could have been a coastal area.

The Growth to Feudalism 
Up to the beginning of the 10th century CE, Ays were the dominant powers in Kerala. The Ay kings ruled from Thiruvalla in the North to Nagercoil in the South. Ptolemy mentions this as from Baris (Pamba River) to Cape Comorin "Aioi" (Kanyakumari). By 12th century, we get the picture from the Thiruvalla copper plates, which are voluminous records that centre around the social life around the temple. The society The Thiruvalla temple had a large Vedic learning school (actually comparable to modern university) ("Thiruvalla salai"), which was one of the foremost learning centres in Kerala. The Thiruvalla salai was one of the richest among the Vedic schools of Kerala, and according to the copper plates, the pupils of the school were fed with 350 nazhis of paddy every day, which shows the vastness of its student population. Thiruvalla held a very eminent position among the spiritual and educational centres in ancient times. The Sri Vallabha Temple was one of the wealthiest temples of ancient Kerala, as is evident from the inscriptions in the plates. The part of the temple land required to 'feed the Brahmins' required 2.1 million litres of rice seeds, and for the "maintenance of the eternal lamps" required more than 340,000 litres of paddy seed capacity. Due to the length, the antiquity and the nature of the language, Thiruvalla copper plates form the "First book in Malayalam", according to Prof. Elamkulam.

Early Modern period 

The rulers of Thiruvalla now belonged to the Thekkumkoor Dynasty, which had one of its headquarters at Idathil near Kaavil Temple. Idathil (Vempolinadu Edathil Karthavu) was the family name of the Thekkumkoor kings. Today's Paliakara Palace is a branch of Lakshmipuram Palace of Changanacherry, which is a branch of Alikottu Kovilakam of Pazhancherry in Malabar. Similarly, Nedumpuram Palace is a branch of Mavelikkara Palace is an heir to the Valluvanad tradition of South Malabar.

The Thekkumkoor kings lost their control in the course of time and Vilakkili (വിലക്കിലി) Nampoothiris were rulers in 1752–53 when Anizham Thirunal Marthanda Varma, the king of Travancore, seized it in a bloody battle in which the ruler was killed, though some dispute it, saying the surrender was peaceful as the Namboothiris were not naive to challenge the mighty army of Ramayyan, the shrewd and sadistic Dalava (ദളവ)- head of administration and advisor – of Travancore.

Politics
The current Chairperson of the Municipality is Cherian Polachirackal and the vice-chairman is Sreerenjini S Pillai for 2018–2020.

Thiruvalla's assembly constituency is part of the newly formed Pathanamthitta (Lok Sabha constituency).
The current MLA is Adv. Mathew T Thomas.
Current MP Pathanamthitta (Lok Sabha constituency) is Anto Antony.

Religion

The city inside the modern municipal limits has an almost equal number of Christians (48.03%) and Hindus (46.92%). Muslims form 4.80% of the population.

Thiruvalla is home to the Sree Vallabha Temple which is the only one of its kind in the State to have Kathakali performed as a ritual offering every night.

Sports 
The popular sports in Thiruvalla are football and cricket. The football history of Thiruvalla can be traced back to the legendary footballer from Thiruvalla, Thomas Varghes, called "Tiruvalla Pappan". He represented India in the London Olympics of 1948, and is described as one of the best defenders of 40's – 50's from India. Today, Thiruvalla hosts many district and state-level football and cricket tournaments. There is a stadium in Thiruvalla maintained by the Thiruvalla Municipal Council. This is the venue for most of the tournaments. It is also called "Prithi stadium".

Indoor Cricket 
The Kerala Cricket Association has set up the world-class indoor cricket stadium complex in Thiruvalla, with world-class facilities, with 24-7 practising facilities. The facility is adjacent to the Thiruvalla Municipal stadium and is constructed on 8000 square feet, on 50 cents of land. The facility also houses a library, multi-gym, board room, KCA district office, and a conference hall. Specially made natural grass wicket is the specialty of the practicing nets in the courtyard. This indoor cricket facility is perhaps, the first of its kind in the state.

Food and other cultural activities 
Thiruvalla hosts cultural events including flower shows and food fests.

Notable persons
 Anna Rajam Malhotra, Indian Administrative Service officer
 Thenmadom Varghese, Indian professional footballer
 Poykayil Yohannan, social activist, poet
 Vennikkulam Gopala Kurup, poet
 Abraham Kovoor, hypnotherapist and rationalist
 Abu Abraham, cartoonist
 Dr. M.M. Thomas, former Governor of Nagaland
 Baselios MarThoma Didymos I, Malankara Metropolitan and Catholicos of Malankara Orthodox Syrian Church
 Babu Thiruvalla, movie director and producer 
 Blessy, movie director
 C. K. Ra, artist
 C.P. Mathen, banker and founder of the Quilon Bank
 C J Kuttappan, folklore artist
 Col. Jojan Thomas, military officer
 John Abraham, movie director
 K. G. George, movie director
 Kakkanadan, novelist and writer
 Mathew T. Thomas, politician
 K. C. John, former General President of India Pentecostal Church of God
 M. G. Soman, movie actor
 Nayanthara (Diana Mariam Kurian), movie actress
 Shalini, actress
 Kaveri, movie actress
 Meera Jasmine (Jasmine Mary Joseph), movie actress
 Nadiya Moythu, movie actress
 Parvathy Jayaram (Ashwathy Kurup), movie actress
 Oormila Unni (actress), movie actress
 Sreeja Chandran, actress
 Kaviyoor Ponnamma, actress
 Kaviyoor Sivaprasad, film director
 Sidhartha Siva, actor, director
 Kailash, movie actor
 Rajeev Pillai, movie actor
 Sajeev John, physicist
 Vishnu Vinod, cricketer

See also
 Adoor
 Changanassery
 Chengannur
 Edathua
 Kattode
 Kozhencherry
 Mavelikara
 Niranam
 Thakazhy

References

External links

 
Cities and towns in Pathanamthitta district